The British Railways Standard Class 4 4-6-0 is a class of steam locomotives, 80 of which were built during the 1950s. Six have been preserved.

Background

The class was introduced in 1951. They were designed for mixed traffic use on secondary routes where the otherwise ubiquitous BR Standard Class 5 and their predecessors, the Black Fives, would be too heavy. They were essentially a tender version of the standard 4 2-6-4T, with similar characteristics to the GWR Manor Class, though unlike the Manors they were built to the universal loading gauge.

Design work was done at Brighton by R. A. Riddles, with help from Swindon, Derby and Doncaster. Construction was at the BR Swindon Works.

Its British Railways power classification was 4MT.

In this configuration its route availability was 4, almost universal over the British Railways network.

In service
The class was initially allocated to the London Midland Region (45) and the Western Region (20). The last 15 were allocated to the Southern Region. This reduced their route availability to 7, the same as the Standard Class 5.

Preservation 
Six members of the class survive with both single chimney and double chimney examples. Two were purchased directly from BR (75027 & 75029); the remaining four were rescued from Woodham Brothers' scrapyard at Barry Island.

No member of the class is presently main line approved but three (75014, 75029 and 75069) have worked on the main line at various points in preservation. 75029 was passed to work on the main line between Grosmont and Whitby with occasional visits to Battersby during galas. All except for 75079 have operated in preservation.

Model railways
Bachmann and Hornby have both recently released models of these engines in 00 gauge. Mainline Railways also released a OO gauge model of the Standard Class 4MT 4-6-0 in the 1970s, although this is no longer in production. In 1983, Mainline's model was reintroduced to their catalogue as locomotive 75033 in BR lined black.

References

 A Detailed History of BR Standard Steam Locomotives, - Vol 2 - The 4-6-0 and 2-6-0 Classes. RCTS

External links

 Southern E-group photo gallery
 75027 webpage at the Bluebell Railway
 75079 webpage at the Mid Hants Railway

4 4-6-0
4-6-0 locomotives
Railway locomotives introduced in 1951